Xenorhina similis is a species of frog in the family Microhylidae.
It is found in New Guinea.
Its natural habitat is subtropical or tropical moist montane forests.
It is threatened by habitat loss.

References

Xenorhina
Amphibians of New Guinea
Taxonomy articles created by Polbot
Amphibians described in 1956